Taverniera sericophylla is a species of legume in the family Fabaceae. Found only in Yemen, the legume's natural habitat is subtropical or tropical dry shrubland. The species is threatened by habitat loss.

References 

Hedysareae
Endemic flora of Socotra
Vulnerable plants
Taxonomy articles created by Polbot
Taxa named by Isaac Bayley Balfour